Bryan Jay Singer (born September 17, 1965) is an American filmmaker. He is the founder of Bad Hat Harry Productions and has produced almost all of the films he has directed.

After graduating from the University of Southern California, Singer directed his first short film, Lion's Den (1988). On the basis of that film, he received financing for his next film, Public Access (1993), which was a co-winner of the Grand Jury Prize at the 1993 Sundance Film Festival. In the mid-1990s, Singer received critical acclaim for directing the neo-noir crime thriller The Usual Suspects (1995). He followed this with another thriller, Apt Pupil (1998), an adaptation of a Stephen King novella about a boy's fascination with a Nazi war criminal. In the 2000s, he became known for big budget superhero films such as X-Men (2000), for which Singer won the 2000 Saturn Award for Best Direction, its sequel X2 (2003), and Superman Returns (2006). He then directed the World War II historical thriller Valkyrie (2008), co-wrote/co-produced X-Men: First Class (2011), and directed the fantasy adventure film Jack the Giant Slayer (2013), as well as two more X-Men films, X-Men: Days of Future Past (2014) and X-Men: Apocalypse (2016). Singer also directed the Queen biographical film Bohemian Rhapsody (2018), although he was fired from the film shortly before its completion in the wake of allegations of sexual misconduct.

Early life
Singer was born in New York City and was adopted by Grace Sinden, an environmental activist, and Norbert Dave Singer, a corporate executive. He grew up in a Jewish household in West Windsor Township, New Jersey. In his early teens, he started making 8mm films as well as experimenting with photography. He attended West Windsor-Plainsboro High School (now renamed West-Windsor Plainsboro High School South), graduating in 1984. He studied filmmaking for two years at the School of Visual Arts in New York, and later transferred to the USC School of Cinematic Arts in Los Angeles where he followed the Critical studies program.

Career

1980s–1990s
Singer directed a short film in 1988 called Lion's Den involving a number of friends, including actor Ethan Hawke, whom he knew from his childhood in New Jersey, and editor John Ottman, whom he had met while working on a friend's short film. After a screening of Lion's Den, Singer was approached by someone from Tokuma Japan Productions, a Japanese company interested in funding a series of low-budget films. Singer pitched a concept that eventually became the film Public Access (1993). Ottman again served as editor but this time also composed the score for the film. At the 1993 Sundance Film Festival, the film was named as co-winner of the Grand Jury Prize with Ruby in Paradise.

In 1994, he founded the production company Bad Hat Harry Productions, in homage to Steven Spielberg and the famous line from Jaws. Singer followed this by directing The Usual Suspects, which was screened out of competition at the 1995 Cannes Film Festival. It was a success, winning Christopher McQuarrie an Academy Award for Best Writing (Original Screenplay), and actor Kevin Spacey an Academy Award for Best Supporting Actor.

In 1998, Singer obtained the rights to adapt Stephen King's novella Apt Pupil, a thriller about an all-American boy discovering that a Nazi war criminal lives in his neighborhood. Singer's film adaptation starred Sir Ian McKellen, Brad Renfro, and David Schwimmer.

2000s

In the early 2000s, Singer was hoping to direct Confessions of a Dangerous Mind based on the Chuck Barris book of the same name. The film was later directed by George Clooney for Miramax Films with Sam Rockwell in the lead role. In February 2001, Singer was attempting to produce a new Battlestar Galactica television series for Studios USA (now NBC Universal Television Studio) Speaking to BBC News, Singer said he was "confident that the Galactica brand is a sleeping giant. It was a show I watched during its initial run, from the pilot to the final episode. The essence and the brand name is quite potent in a climate where there's a great deficit of sci-fi programming." Singer eventually left the project, which was produced by another team on the Sci Fi Channel.

In mid-2004, Singer was in negotiations to direct X-Men: The Last Stand for Fox, when Singer agreed to direct Superman Returns for Warner Bros. In consequence, Fox terminated its production deal with Bad Hat Harry Productions, Singer's production company.

Superman Returns was filmed in Australia in 2005, and was released on June 28, 2006. Singer claimed that he had always admired and identified with the character, citing the fact that he and Superman are both orphans, noting that he was inspired by the 1978 film starring Christopher Reeve and the comics of Alex Ross.

In August 2009, Universal Pictures announced that Singer would direct and produce a big screen reimagining of the Battlestar Galactica television series of the late-1970s, which would not draw any material from the Syfy Channel reimagined series.

On September 10, 2009, it was announced NBC has partnered with Singer and Bryan Fuller to adapt Augusten Burroughs's Sellevision into a series about a fictional home shopping network, according to The Hollywood Reporter. Neither project was ultimately produced.

At the premiere of James Cameron's Avatar on December 16, 2009, Singer confirmed that he would be directing Jack the Giant Slayer (2013) for Warner Bros, and that he had signed on to do X-Men: First Class, but conflicts between the two projects led to Singer being only a producer and co-screenwriter on First Class, with Matthew Vaughn taking over directorial duties.

2010s
In October 2012, it was announced that Singer would direct the next movie in the series, X-Men: Days of Future Past; Vaughn stayed on as a producer and screenwriter, and the film was released in May 2014. Singer produced the commercials for the ice cream Magnum Gold, which featured Benicio del Toro. In 2012, Singer was the executive producer alongside Jane Lynch of the short film, Ronny and I, directed by Guy Shalem that screened at Outfest and Cannes. Singer directed another X-Men film, X-Men: Apocalypse, that he also produced and co-wrote with Simon Kinberg, Dan Harris, and Michael Dougherty. Days of Future Past stars Hugh Jackman, James McAvoy, Michael Fassbender, Nicholas Hoult, Jennifer Lawrence, and Evan Peters re-teamed with Singer for Apocalypse.

In 2015, Singer, Bad Hat Harry Productions, and Same Name Productions started to collaborate on a documentary project with Guy Shalem. The documentary was set to explore the Israeli–Palestinian conflict through the vantage point of a dynamic Arab-Israeli activist.

In 2016, Fox announced that Singer would direct its version of 20,000 Leagues under the Sea, after having been asked to participate on the elaboration of the movie's script.

After the release of X-Men: Apocalypse, Singer expressed interest in directing a solo Mystique film starring Jennifer Lawrence.

In November 2016, it was announced that Singer would direct the Queen biopic Bohemian Rhapsody. He produced the film with Jim Beach and Graham King. On December 1, 2017, The Hollywood Reporter reported that 20th Century Fox had temporarily halted production due to the "unexpected unavailability" of Singer, with sources saying that he had failed to return to the set after the Thanksgiving week. Producers were nervous about the state of production and started discussions about potentially replacing him, at which point cinematographer Newton Thomas Sigel may have stepped in to direct during Singer's absence. Singer's absence was reportedly due to "a personal health matter concerning [him] and his family", and Singer's representatives stated that he was visiting his ill mother. However, other sources stated that the film's lead actor Rami Malek and the crew had grown tired of Singer's behavior; Singer had reportedly shown up late to set on multiple occasions, and has repeatedly clashed with Malek. On December 4, 2017, Singer was fired as a director with about two weeks remaining in principal photography. Singer's replacement Dexter Fletcher is quoted saying he came in and "just finished it up, really." 20th Century Fox terminated his Bad Hat Harry Productions deal with the studio. Singer still received directorial credit for Bohemian Rhapsody due to a Directors Guild of America ruling that only a sole director can receive credit.

At the end of January 2017, Singer signed on to direct an action adventure pilot in the X-Men Universe entitled The Gifted. The show was broadcast on Fox and canceled after two seasons.

Personal life
Singer is bisexual, and has said that growing up Jewish and a sexual minority influenced his movies. He and actress Michelle Clunie have a son who was born in January 2015.

Sexual assault allegations

1997 lawsuit
In 1997, a 14-year-old extra accused Singer of asking him and other minors to film a shower scene nude for the film Apt Pupil. Two other adolescent boys, 16 and 17 years old, later supported the 14-year-old's claim. The boys claimed trauma from the experience and filed a civil suit against the filmmakers alleging infliction of emotional distress, negligence, and invasion of privacy, and alleged that they were filmed for sexual gratification. While some sources state that the civil case was dismissed due to insufficient evidence, others indicate that it was settled out of court. The Los Angeles County District Attorney's Office declined to press criminal charges.

2014 lawsuits and allegations
In April 2014, Singer was accused in a civil lawsuit of sexual assault of a minor. According to the suit filed by attorney Jeff Herman, Singer is alleged to have drugged and raped actor and model Michael Egan in Hawaii after meeting him at parties hosted by convicted sex offender Marc Collins-Rector in the late 1990s. Singer's attorney called the allegations "completely fabricated" and said Singer planned to countersue. Singer denied the allegations in a statement, calling them "outrageous, vicious, and completely false". On May 22, 2014, Singer's attorney presented evidence to Federal District Judge Susan Oki Mollway stating that neither Singer nor Egan was in Hawaii at the time. In early August 2014, Egan sought to withdraw his lawsuit via a Request for Court Order of Dismissal, and asked that it be granted "without prejudice or an award of costs or fees, in the interest of justice." Later Egan was sentenced over unrelated charges of conspiracy to commit securities and wire fraud.

In May 2014, another lawsuit was filed by attorney Jeff Herman on behalf of an anonymous British man. Both Singer and producer Gary Goddard (who was also named separately in the first case) were accused of sexually assaulting "John Doe No. 117". According to the lawsuit, Goddard and Singer met the man for sex when he was a minor and engaged in acts of "gender violence" against him while in London for the premiere of Superman Returns. The charge against Singer in this case was dismissed, at the accuser's request, in July 2014.

Singer was cited in the 2014 documentary film on child sexual abuse in Hollywood, An Open Secret, but details of Egan's allegations were omitted after Egan withdrew his lawsuit during the film's production. Author Bret Easton Ellis alleged that two of his former partners had attended underage sex parties hosted by Singer and fellow director Roland Emmerich.

2017 lawsuit
On December 7, 2017, Cesar Sanchez-Guzman filed a lawsuit in Washington against Singer, alleging that he had been raped at age 17 by the director in 2003. Singer denied the allegations and removed himself from the public eye. After the lawsuit was announced, the USC School of Cinematic Arts removed Singer's name from its Division of Cinema & Media Studies program, an action which had previously been petitioned for by students at the school due to the many allegations against him.

In June 2019, Sanchez-Guzman's bankruptcy trustee Nancy James recommended that a $150,000 settlement be approved, citing the absence of evidence that Singer attended the yacht party where the alleged assault took place. Singer's attorney Andrew Brettler said that Singer has maintained his innocence and that the "decision to resolve the matter with the bankruptcy trustee was purely a business one". Much of the settlement would go towards paying creditors and the administrators of the case, with the remainder allocated to Sanchez-Guzman.

2019 allegations
On January 23, 2019, Alex French and Maximillian Potter published an investigative report in The Atlantic in which four more men alleged that Singer sexually assaulted them when they were underage. The article also claimed that Sanchez-Guzman's 2017 lawsuit was stalled when Singer's legal team reported Sanchez-Guzman to the Internal Revenue Service and to US immigration officials, although this was disputed by one of Singer's lawyers. In response to the men's allegations, Singer denied any association with them and described the journalists as "homophobic".

In the wake of the renewed allegations, GLAAD withdrew Bohemian Rhapsodys nomination for the year's GLAAD Media Award in the Outstanding Film – Wide Release category and stated, "Singer's response to The Atlantic story wrongfully used 'homophobia' to deflect from sexual assault allegations". Time's Up released a statement on Twitter applauding the decision, stating, "The recent allegations regarding Bryan Singer's behavior are horrifying and MUST be taken seriously and investigated." On February 6, the British Academy of Film and Television Arts removed Singer's name from Bohemian Rhapsodys nomination for the BAFTA Award for Best British Film due to the allegations against him.

On February 11, Millennium Films stated that Red Sonja, a film that Singer had been attached to direct, was no longer on their slate of films, although the company's founder Avi Lerner had earlier defended hiring Singer despite the allegations.

Filmography

Film

Television

Web series

Recurring collaborators

Awards and nominations

References

External links

Official Website

1965 births
Living people
Film producers from New York (state)
Jewish American screenwriters
American television directors
Television producers from New York City
BAFTA winners (people)
Bisexual men
Film directors from New York City
Science fiction film directors
LGBT Jews
People from West Windsor, New Jersey
West Windsor-Plainsboro High School South alumni
USC School of Cinematic Arts alumni
School of Visual Arts alumni
American adoptees
LGBT people from New Jersey
Fantasy film directors
American male screenwriters
Writers from New York City
Screenwriters from New Jersey
American LGBT screenwriters
Screenwriters from New York (state)
Film directors from New Jersey
Film producers from New Jersey
LGBT television directors
21st-century American Jews
21st-century LGBT people
Television producers from New Jersey
LGBT film directors
American bisexual writers